Armand de Fluvià i Escorsa (born 1931), is a Catalan genealogist and heraldist. He specializes in Catalan genealogies and in the dynasties of the counts of the Catalan Countries. He has also been a pioneer of the gay rights movement since the last years of the Francoist dictatorship. He was one of the founders of Nacionalistes d'Esquerra (Leftist Nationalists).

Early life 
Armand de Fluvià i Escorsa was born in Barcelona, Spain, the son of Armand de Fluvià i Vendrell. In 1959, he graduated with a law degree from the University of Barcelona. In 1960 he became a member of the Barcelona Bar Association.

Career 
After finishing a course in paleography and diplomatics in the Faculty of Philosophy and Arts of the University of Barcelona, de Fluvià became involved in genealogy and heraldry. He is a member of the International Institute of Genealogy and Heraldry and of the Salazar y Castro Institute of the CSIC.

In 1984, de Fluvià received the Arenberg Prize in genealogy (1984) and since 1985, he has been a member of the Académie Internationale d'Héraldique (International Academy of Heraldry). He was founder and president (1983–2007) of the Societat Catalana de Genealogia, Heràldica, Sigil·lografia, Vexil·lologia i Nobiliària (Catalan Society of Genalogy, Heraldry, Sigillography, Vexillology, and Nobility). He is also a member of the Institut d'Estudis Gironins (Institute of Studies about Girona) (1967) and a numerary member of the Institut d'Estudis Empordanesos (Institute of Studies about the Empordà (1967–93), consultant of the Arxiu Històric de la Ciutat de Barcelona (Historical Archive of the City of Barcelona) (1983) and of the National Archive of Catalonia (1983).

In 1996, de Fluvià gave his bibliographic and documentary collection to the Generalitat de Catalunya (Catalan regional government). At the time, he opposed the change of heraldry symbols that had been approved by the Ajuntament de Barcelona (Barcelona City Hall). In 2000, he was awarded the Creu de Sant Jordi and in 2008 received the Golden Medal of Barcelona.

On 24 October 2007, he founded the Institució Catalana de Genealogia i Heràldica (Catalan Institution of Genealogy and Heraldry) (ICGenHer) and is until present day, the president.

Activist 
In 1953, de Fluvià was a member of the monarchical group Joventut Espanyola d'Acció (Spanish Youth of Action) (JEA). In 1957, he was imprisoned for political activism. He took part in the Caputxinada and until 1969, he was a member of the political secretary's office of Infante Juan, Count of Barcelona. He later became involved in Catalan separatist movement and the defence of gay rights.

In 1976, he became a member of the Socialist Convergence of Catalonia (CSC), which he abandoned in 1979 in order to become one of the founders of Nacionalistes d'Esquerra (Leftist Nationalists) (Nd'E) and, in 1985, of its splinter group, Moviment d'Esquerra Nacionalista (Leftist Nationalist Movement) (MEN). From 1981 to 1993, he was an active member of the Crida a la Solidaritat (Call to Solidarity).
 
In 1970, when homosexuality was still illegal in Spain, de Fluvià founded the Spanish Movement of Homosexual Liberation. In 1974, he taught a course on sexual anthropology at the Universitat Catalana d'Estiu (Summer Catalan University). He founded and became the first leader of the Front d'Alliberament Gai de Catalunya (Gay Liberation Front of Catalonia) and was president of the Lambda Institute.

Works 
 Pacte de Joia (1974). 
 Diccionari general d'heràldica (1982). 
 Els Primitius Comtats i Vescomtats de Catalunya (1989). 
 Els quatre pals, l'escut dels comtes de Barcelona (1994). 
 A la recerca dels avantpassats (1995). 
 Repertori de grandeses, títols i corporacions nobiliàries de Catalunya (1998). 
 El moviment gai a la clandestinitat del franquisme (1970–75) (2003).  
 Repertori de grandeses, títols i corporacions nobiliàries de Catalunya II (2004). 
 L'apropiació dels Símbols Nacionals de Catalunya per part d'historiadors aragonesos (2009). 
 Catalunya, un país sense escut (2010). 
 Historia de una falsificación Nobiliaria: La Baronia de Gavín en Aragón (2010). 
 Manual d'heràldica i tècnica del blasó (2011). 
 Qui eren els meus avantpassats? Nou manual de genealogia (2012). 
 Manual de Nobiliària Catalana (2012). 
 Nobiliari General Català. Volum V (2014). 

 Document collection 
His personal document collection is preserved in the National Archive of Catalonia.

His  collection contains all the documents that Armand de Fluvià has produced or received along his life:
 Family and personal documents (cards, agendas and notes). 
 Professional documents and work materials that are linked with his activities as a genealogist and heraldist, family trees, photos of world royal houses and of families of Catalan nobility.
 Archives of the marquis de la Cuesta. 
 Documents linked with the Political Secretary of Infante Juan, Count of Barcelona in Catalonia (circulars, correspondence and invoices) with societies that defended the "monarchic rights" (letters, circulars, press excerpts about royal families and about the counts of Barcelona); 
 Documents about the society Amigos de los Castillos'' (Friends of the castles) (statutes, correspondence, reports and acts); 
 Documents about Carlism (programs, communiqués and correspondence). 
 Documents in favour of gay rights. 
The collection includes monographies and regular publications about genealogy, heraldry, monarchy, nobility and history.

References

External links 

 Personal website. 
 Armand de Fluvià's documentary collection in the National Archive of Catalonia. 
 Institució Catalana de Genealogia i Heràldica (Catalan Institution of Genealogy and Heraldry) (ICGenHer). 

1931 births
Historians from Catalonia
Vexillologists
Spanish genealogists
University of Barcelona alumni
Living people
Writers from Barcelona
Spanish gay writers
21st-century LGBT people
Inmates of Presó Model de Barcelona
Spanish human rights activists